Quercus × dysophylla is a species of oak tree. It grows in central Mexico in Hidalgo, México State, D.F., Puebla, Michoacán, and San Luis Potosí. Its parents are Q. crassifolia and Q. crassipes, both members of section Lobatae.

References

External links
 photo of herbarium specimen at Missouri Botanical Garden, collected in Puebla in 1911

dysophylla
Endemic oaks of Mexico
Trees of Michoacán
Trees of Puebla
Trees of Veracruz
Plants described in 1840